Here on Earth is the fifteenth solo studio album and sixteenth studio album overall by American country music singer Tim McGraw. It was released on August 21, 2020, by Big Machine Records. It is McGraw's first album since rejoining Big Machine. The album was produced by McGraw and Byron Gallimore. The release was preceded by the release of "I Called Mama".

Background
Following the release of his 2015 album, Damn Country Music, McGraw's contract with Big Machine Records expired. McGraw and his wife Faith Hill signed a deal with Sony Music Nashville's parent company Sony Music Entertainment in February 2017. This deal saw the release of McGraw and Hill's first duet album, The Rest of Our Life, in November 2017, on Sony's Arista Nashville imprint. Two solo singles followed, 2018's "Neon Church" and 2019's "Thought About You", both released on Sony's Columbia Nashville imprint. McGraw returned to Big Machine Records in February 2020, following his departure from Sony earlier in the year.

The album was described in a press release as "a collection of songs McGraw brought together to create vignettes of shared human emotions such as love, relationships, introspection and fun. The album as a whole provides a musical tapestry of life and a shared experience that we can use to connect all the different lives that we live, all the different parts of the world that we come from and use music as the universal language to bring people together."

Release and promotion
The album title was announced in February 2020 along with the news that McGraw had returned to Big Machine Records. The album was released on August 21, 2020.

Singles
The album's first single, "I Called Mama", was released in May, 2020, and reached at number 8 on the Billboard Hot Country Songs chart, number 2 on the Billboard Country Airplay chart, the Top 30 on the Billboard Adult Contemporary chart, and number 53 on the Billboard Hot 100. The song peaked at number 2 on the Billboard Canada Country singles chart.

The music video premiered on May 27, 2020, and is "a tribute to mothers everywhere" with clips of McGraw's fans and their mothers, as well as appearances by his own mother, Betty Trimble, and wife, Faith Hill.

The title track was released as a promotional single on July 10, 2020, along with the album's pre-order. The song's music video premiered the same day.

The second single to radio, "Undivided" with Tyler Hubbard, was released on January 13, 2021. It is part of the Ultimate Edition of the album released April 9, 2021. This marks McGraw's and Hubbard's second collaboration following "May We All" in 2016.

"7500 OBO", which was originally slated to be a single before the release of "Undivided", was released as the album's third single on August 2, 2021.

Tour
The album was originally planned to be accompanied by the Here on Earth Tour, which was scheduled to begin on July 10, 2020, but it was cancelled due to the 2020 COVID-19 pandemic.

Track listing

Personnel
Adapted from AllMusic & liner notes.

Performers
 Greg Barnhill – backing vocals (all tracks except 4 & 17) 
 Byron Gallimore – backing vocals (track 19)
 Tania Hancheroff – backing vocals (track 23)
 Wes Hightower – backing vocals (track 4) 
 Faith Hill – featured vocals (track 23)
 Tyler Hubbard – featured vocals (track 17)
 Tim McGraw – lead vocals (all tracks)
 Sarah West - backing vocals (track 23)

Musicians
 
 
 Paul Bushnell – keyboards (tracks 1-3, 19, 24), bass guitar (all tracks except 16), fiddle (track 22)
 Byron Gallimore – keyboards (tracks 2, 4, 7, 9, 10, 18, 19, 23), acoustic guitar (track 16), electric guitar (track 24)
 Charlie Judge – keyboards (track 9) 
 Michael Landau – baritone guitar (track 17), electric guitar (tracks 1-19, 21, 22)
 Troy Lancaster – electric guitar (track 24) 
 David Levita – electric guitar (all tracks except 17)
 Jamie Muhoberac – keyboards (all tracks except 17)
 Steve Nathan – keyboards (tracks 9, 12-14, 16, 20), piano (track 23)
 Jeff Roach - keyboards (tracks 23, 24)
 Mike Rojas – keyboards (tracks 1-8, 10, 11, 15, 18, 19, 21, 22)
 Alex Wright – Hammond B-3 organ (track 17), keyboards (track 17), piano (track 17), synthesizer (track 17)
 Sol Philcox-Littlefield – electric guitar (tracks 9, 12-14, 20)
 Derek Wells – electric guitar (track 23)
 Todd Lombardo - acoustic guitar (track 17), mandolin (track 17), banjo (track 17)
 Ilya Toshinsky – acoustic guitar (all tracks except 17), dobro (track 18), mandolin (track 5), banjo (track 22)
 Dan Dugmore – steel guitar (tracks 1-8, 10-16, 18-23)
 Stuart Duncan – fiddle (track 22)
 Glenn Worf – bass guitar (track 16)
 Miles McPherson – drums (track 17)
 Wes Little – drums (track 23)
 Shannon Forrest – drums (all tracks except 17 & 23), percussion (track 1-6, 8, 10-16, 18, 20-22)
 Eric Darken – percussion (track 23)
 Marvin B. Gordy – percussion (track 23)
 Erik Lutkins – percussion (tracks 11, 20)
 Corey Crowder – programming (track 17)
 David Campbell – string arrangements (tracks 1, 5, 14, 23, 24), conductor (track 23)
 Adam Klemens - conductor (track 24)
 The Filmharmonic Orchestra – strings (track 24)
 Jacob Braun – cello (tracks 1, 5)
 Suzie Katayama – cello (tracks 1, 5, 23)
 Anthony LaMarchina – cello (track 14)
 Timothy Landauer – cello (track 23)
 Dane Little – cello (tracks 1, 5)
 David Stone – upright bass (track 23)
 Timothy Eckert – upright bass (track 23)
 Andrew Duckles – viola (tracks 1, 5, 23)
 Matt Funes – viola (tracks 1, 5, 23)
 Luke Maurer – viola (tracks 1, 5)
 Darrin McCann – viola (track 23)
 John Wittenberg – viola (tracks 1, 5)
 Charlie Bisharat – violin (tracks 1, 5)
 Jackie Brand – violin (tracks 1, 5, 23)
 Mario De León – violin (tracks 1, 5, 23)
 Jessica E. Guideri – violin (tracks 1, 5)
 Tamara Hatwan – violin (tracks 1, 5, 23)
 Marisa Kuney – violin (tracks 1, 5)
 Lorand Lokuszta – violin (track 23)
 Songa Lee – violin (tracks 1, 5, 23)
 Natalie Leggett – violin (tracks 1, 5)
 Serena McKinney – violin (track 23)
 Grace Oh – violin (track 23)
 Alyssa Park – violin (track 23)
 Sara Parkins – violin (tracks 1, 5)
 Michele Richards – violin (tracks 1, 5, 23)
 Neil Samples – violin (track 23)
 Sarah Thornblade – violin (tracks 1, 5, 23)
 Mary Katherine Vanosdale – violin (track 14)
 Josefina Vergara – violin (track 23)

Production
 Corey Crowder – producer (track 17)
 Byron Gallimore – producer (all tracks), mixing 
 Tyler Hubbard – producer (track 17)
 Tim McGraw – producer (all tracks)
 Missi Gallimore – A&R
 Shannon Forrest – recording 
 Erik Lutkins – recording, mixing
 Steve Churchyard – string recording
 Adam Ayan – mastering
 Doug Rich – copy coordinator 
 Elvis Presley – quotation author

Visual and imagery
 Sandi Spika Borchetta – art direction 
 Kelly Clague – art direction 
 Justin Ford – art direction
 JP Robinson – art direction, design 
 Stevie Robinson –design
 Danny Clinch – cover photography 
 Michael Fitcher – photography
 David Needleman – photography

Charts

Weekly charts

Year-end charts

References

2020 albums
Big Machine Records albums
Tim McGraw albums
Albums produced by Byron Gallimore